The A85 autoroute is a motorway in France.  It connects the A11 at Angers to the A71 at  Vierzon.  It is 270 km long.

History

The motorway was opened in 1997. It starts at the Péage de Corzé north of Angers and in 1997 went to Bourgueil.  In 2007 the Bourgueil to Langeais 26 km extension was opened. In December 2007 the remaining Azay-le-Rideau to Theillay section opening making 206 km in total.

Junctions

Exchange A11-A85 Junction with the A11 autoroute.
01 (Beaufort-en-Vallée)
02 (Longué-Jumelles)
03 (Vivy-Saumur)Road site art: Le Cheval de Saumur
04 (Brain-sur-Allonnes) (construction postponed)  
05 (Bourgueil) 
06 (Restigné) (construction postponed)  
07 (Langeais-Est) 
08 (Vallères-Villandry) 
09 (Druye-Tours)
Exchange A10-A85 Junction with the A10 autoroute.
10 (Esvres) 
11 (Bléré) 
12 (Saint-Aignan)
13 (Selles-sur-Cher)
14 (Villefranche-sur-Cher-Romorantin-Lanthenay)
Exchange A71-A85 Junction with the A71 autoroute.

Proposed Extensions 
 Bourges to Chalon-sur-Saône via Nevers
 Corzé to Rennes via Château-Gontier and Laval

Sections Now Open
 Bourgueil to Langeais : Opened 29 January 2007(26 km)
 Azay-le-Rideau to Esvres : Opening April 2008 (11lkm)

References

External links
 A85 Motorway in Saratlas

A85